The Banyuasin River is a river in southern Sumatra, Indonesia, about 500 km northwest of the capital Jakarta.

Geography
The river flows in the southern area of Sumatra with predominantly tropical rainforest climate (designated as Af in the Köppen–Geiger climate classification). The annual average temperature in the area is 23 °C. The warmest month is Juli, when the average temperature is around 24 °C, and the coldest is March, at 22 °C. The average annual rainfall is 2579 mm. The wettest month is April, with an average of 344 mm rainfall, and the driest is September, with 99 mm rainfall.

See also
List of rivers of Indonesia
List of rivers of Sumatra

References

Rivers of South Sumatra
Rivers of Indonesia